The 2021 St Albans City and District Council election took place on 6 May 2021, delayed by one year due to the COVID-19 pandemic, to elect members of St Albans City and District Council in England. This was on the same day as other local elections. At the elections, the Liberal Democrats achieved a majority for the first time since 2011 and took the council back from no overall control.

Results summary

Ward Results

Ashley 

 
Source:

Batchwood

Clarence 

* A by-election took place in this ward on the 3rd October 2019 in order to fill a seat vacancy.

Cunningham

Harpenden East

Harpenden North

Harpenden South

Harpenden West

London Colney

Marshalswick North

Marshalswick South

Park Street 

David Yates was the sitting councillor, and had been elected as a Liberal Democrat in 2016.

Redbourn

Sopwell

St Peters

St Stephen

Verulam

Wheathampstead

References 

Saint Albans
St Albans City and District Council elections
May 2021 events in the United Kingdom
2020s in Hertfordshire